Events from the year 1504 in England.

Incumbents
 Monarch – Henry VII
 Lord Chancellor – William Warham
 Lord Privy Seal – Richard Foxe
 Secretary of State – Thomas Ruthall

Events
18 February – Henry Tudor created Prince of Wales following the death of his elder brother Arthur, Prince of Wales two years earlier
March – Private liveried retainers banned as part of a clampdown on the feudal tradition
 Silver shilling is the first English coin to be minted bearing a recognisable portrait of the King.

Births
 Matthew Parker, Archbishop of Canterbury (died 1574)
 Nicholas Udall, playwright and schoolmaster (died 1556)
 John Dudley, 1st Duke of Northumberland, Tudor nobleman and politician (executed 1553)

Deaths
 Thomas Stanley, 1st Earl of Derby (born 1435)
 John Paston, soldier and public official (born 1444)
 William Danvers, judge (born 1428)

 
Years of the 16th century in England